The 2003 Louisville Cardinals football team represented the University of Louisville in the 2003 NCAA Division I-A football season. The team, led by Bobby Petrino in his first year at the school, played their home games in Papa John's Cardinal Stadium.

Schedule

References

Louisville
Louisville Cardinals football seasons
Louisville Cardinals football